Prince Sultan bin Abdul Aziz Stadium is a multi-purpose stadium in Abha, Saudi Arabia.  It is currently used mostly for football matches. It is the home stadium of Abha and Damac.  The stadium has a capacity of 20,000 people. It is named after Prince Sultan bin Abdul Aziz, former Crown Prince of Saudi Arabia.

References 

Abha
Football venues in Saudi Arabia
Sports venues completed in 1984